Bad Therapy is a 2020 American comedy thriller film directed by William Teitler from a screenplay by Nancy Doyne, based on the novel Judy Small by Doyne. It's been described as a mixture of thriller, comedy and drama. It stars Alicia Silverstone, Rob Corddry, and Michaela Watkins.

It was released on April 17, 2020, by Gravitas Ventures. Forgoing a theatrical release due to the COVID-19 pandemic, the film was released to on-demand platforms.

Summary
Susan and Bob Howard, a married couple, attend marriage counseling from Judy Small, a manipulative and unhinged therapist.

Cast
 Alicia Silverstone as Susan Howard
 Rob Corddry as Bob Howard
 Michaela Watkins as Judy Small
 Haley Joel Osment as Reed
 Aisha Tyler as Roxy
 Sarah Shahi as Annabelle
 David Paymer as Dr. Edward Kingsley
 Dichen Lachman as Stern
 John Ross Bowie as Nick
 Ginger Gonzaga as Miranda
 Flula Borg as Serge
 Anna Pniowsky as Louise Howard
 Erik Griffin as Principal Sykes
 Gavin Leatherwood as Spit

Production
In May 2018, it was announced Sarah Shahi had joined the cast of the film, with William Teitler directing from a screenplay by Nancy Doyne, based upon her novel Judy Small. In July 2018, Alicia Silverstone, Rob Corddry and Michaela Watkins joined the cast of the film. In August 2018, Anna Pniowsky joined the cast of the film.

Release
In March 2020, Gravitas Ventures acquired distribution rights to the film and set it for an April 17, 2020, release.

Reception

References

External links
 

2020 films
2020s comedy thriller films
American comedy thriller films
Films based on American novels
2020s English-language films
2020s American films